Edmund Carpenter may refer to:

 Edmund Nelson Carpenter (1865–1952), member of the U.S. House of Representatives from Pennsylvania
 Edmund Snow Carpenter (1922–2011), American anthropologist
 Edmund N. Carpenter II (1921–2008), American lawyer

See also
Ed Carpenter (disambiguation)